This a list of statistical procedures which can be used for the analysis of categorical data, also known as data on the nominal scale and as categorical variables.

General tests

 Bowker's test of symmetry
 Categorical distribution, general model
 Chi-squared test
 Cochran–Armitage test for trend
 Cochran–Mantel–Haenszel statistics
 Correspondence analysis
 Cronbach's alpha
 Diagnostic odds ratio
 G-test
 Generalized estimating equations
 Generalized linear models
 Krichevsky–Trofimov estimator
 Kuder–Richardson Formula 20
 Linear discriminant analysis
 Multinomial distribution
 Multinomial logit
 Multinomial probit
 Multiple correspondence analysis
 Odds ratio
 Poisson regression
 Powered partial least squares discriminant analysis
 Qualitative variation
 Randomization test for goodness of fit
 Relative risk
 Stratified analysis
 Tetrachoric correlation
 Uncertainty coefficient
 Wald test

Binomial data

 Bernstein inequalities (probability theory)
 Binomial regression
 Binomial proportion confidence interval
 Chebyshev's inequality
 Chernoff bound
 Gauss's inequality
 Markov's inequality
 Rule of succession
 Rule of three (medicine)
 Vysochanskiï–Petunin inequality

2 × 2 tables

 Chi-squared test
 Diagnostic odds ratio
Fisher's exact test
 G-test
 Odds ratio
 Relative risk
 McNemar's test
 Yates's correction for continuity

Measures of association

 Aickin's α
 Andres and Marzo's delta
 Bangdiwala's B
 Bennett, Alpert, and Goldstein’s S
 Brennan and Prediger’s κ
 Coefficient of colligation - Yule's Y
 Coefficient of consistency
 Coefficient of raw agreement
 Conger's Kappa
 Contingency coefficient – Pearson's C
 Cramér's V
 Dice's coefficient
 Fleiss' kappa
 Goodman and Kruskal's lambda
 Guilford’s G
 Gwet's AC1 
 Hanssen–Kuipers discriminant
 Heidke skill score
 Jaccard index
 Janson and Vegelius' C
 Kappa statistics
 Klecka's tau
 Krippendorff's Alpha
 Kuipers performance index
 Matthews correlation coefficient
 Phi coefficient
 Press' Q
 Renkonen similarity index
 Prevalence adjusted bias adjusted kappa
 Sakoda's adjusted Pearson's C
 Scott's Pi
 Sørensen similarity index
 Stouffer's Z
 True skill statistic
 Tschuprow's T
 Tversky index
 Von Eye's kappa

Categorical manifest variables as latent variable
 Latent variable model
 Item response theory
 Rasch model
 Latent class analysis

See also
Categorical distribution

Categorical data
Analysis